Fitzroy is a suburb in southern Hamilton in New Zealand. It is named after Robert FitzRoy, who commanded  and was later the Governor of New Zealand. It was declared a suburb in 1974.

Demographics

Fitzroy had a population of 2,829 at the 2018 New Zealand census, an increase of 957 people (51.1%) since the 2013 census, and an increase of 948 people (50.4%) since the 2006 census. There were 1,059 households, comprising 1,299 males and 1,527 females, giving a sex ratio of 0.85 males per female. The median age was 39.1 years (compared with 37.4 years nationally), with 504 people (17.8%) aged under 15 years, 543 (19.2%) aged 15 to 29, 1,152 (40.7%) aged 30 to 64, and 627 (22.2%) aged 65 or older.

Ethnicities were 69.7% European/Pākehā, 16.6% Māori, 5.2% Pacific peoples, 18.2% Asian, and 2.8% other ethnicities. People may identify with more than one ethnicity.

The percentage of people born overseas was 27.8, compared with 27.1% nationally.

Although some people chose not to answer the census's question about religious affiliation, 40.7% had no religion, 44.3% were Christian, 0.4% had Māori religious beliefs, 3.5% were Hindu, 1.0% were Muslim, 0.3% were Buddhist and 3.2% had other religions.

Of those at least 15 years old, 570 (24.5%) people had a bachelor's or higher degree, and 441 (19.0%) people had no formal qualifications. The median income was $33,100, compared with $31,800 nationally. 309 people (13.3%) earned over $70,000 compared to 17.2% nationally. The employment status of those at least 15 was that 1,149 (49.4%) people were employed full-time, 282 (12.1%) were part-time, and 87 (3.7%) were unemployed.

See also
 List of streets in Hamilton
Suburbs of Hamilton, New Zealand

References

Suburbs of Hamilton, New Zealand